Boraginaceae, the borage or forget-me-not family, includes about 2,000 species of shrubs, trees and herbs in 146, to 156 genera with a worldwide distribution.

The APG IV system from 2016 classifies the Boraginaceae as single family of the order Boraginales within the asterids. Under the older Cronquist system it was included in Lamiales, but it is now clear that it is no more similar to the other families in this order than they are to families in several other asterid orders. A revision of the Boraginales, also from 2016, split the Boraginaceae in eleven distinct families: Boraginaceae sensu stricto, Codonaceae, Coldeniaceae, Cordiaceae, Ehretiaceae, Heliotropiaceae, Hoplestigmataceae, Hydrophyllaceae, Lennoaceae, Namaceae, and Wellstediaceae.

These plants have alternately arranged leaves, or a combination of alternate and opposite leaves. The leaf blades usually have a narrow shape; many are linear or lance-shaped. They are smooth-edged or toothed, and some have petioles. Most species have bisexual flowers, but some taxa are dioecious. Most pollination is by hymenopterans, such as bees. Most species have inflorescences that have a coiling shape, at least when new, called scorpioid cymes. The flower has a usually five-lobed calyx. The corolla varies in shape from rotate to bell-shaped to tubular, but it generally has five lobes. It can be green, white, yellow, orange, pink, purple, or blue. There are five stamens and one style with one or two stigmas. The fruit is a drupe, sometimes fleshy.

Most members of this family have hairy leaves. The coarse character of the hairs is due to cystoliths of silicon dioxide and calcium carbonate. These hairs can induce an adverse skin reaction, including itching and rash in some individuals, particularly among people who handle the plants regularly, such as gardeners.  In some species, anthocyanins cause the flowers to change color from red to blue with age. This may be a signal to pollinators that a flower is old and depleted of pollen and nectar.

Well-known members of the family include:
 alkanet (Alkanna tinctoria)
 borage (Borago officinalis)
 comfrey (Symphytum spp.)
 fiddleneck (Amsinckia spp.)
 forget-me-not (Myosotis spp.)
 geigertree (Cordia sebestena)
 green alkanet (Pentaglottis sempervirens)
 heliotrope (Heliotropium spp.)
 hound's tongue (Cynoglossum spp.)
 lungwort (Pulmonaria spp.)
 oysterplant (Mertensia maritima)
 purple viper's bugloss/Salvation Jane (Echium plantagineum)
 Siberian bugloss (Brunnera macrophylla)
 viper's bugloss (Echium vulgare)

Genera 
According to Kew;

 Actinocarya
 Adelinia 
 Adelocaryum
 Aegonychon
 Afrotysonia
 Ailuroglossum
 Alkanna
 Amblynotus
 Amphibologyne
 Amsinckia
 Amsinckiopsis
 Anchusa
 Ancistrocarya
 Andersonglossum
 Anoplocaryum
 Antiotrema
 Antiphytum
 Arnebia
 Asperugo
 Auxemma
 Borago
 Bothriospermum
 Bourreria
 Brachybotrys
 Brandella
 Brunnera
 Buglossoides
 Caccinia
 Cerinthe
 Chionocharis
 Choriantha
 Codon
 Coldenia
 Cordia
 Craniospermum
 Crucicaryum
 Cryptantha
 Cynoglossopsis
 Cynoglossum
 Cynoglottis
 Cystostemon
 Dasynotus
 Decalepidanthus
 Draperia
 Echiochilon
 Echium
 Ehretia
 Ellisia
 Embadium
 Emmenanthe
 Eremocarya
 Eriodictyon
 Eritrichium
 Eucrypta
 Euploca
 Gastrocotyle
 Glandora
 Greeneocharis
 Gyrocaryum
 Hackelia
 Halacsya
 Halgania
 Harpagonella
 Heliocarya
 Heliotropium
 Hesperochiron
 Heterocaryum
 Huynhia
 Hydrophyllum
 Iberodes
 Ivanjohnstonia
 Ixorhea
 Johnstonella
 Lappula
 Lasiocaryum
 Lennoa
 Lepechiniella
 Lepidocordia
 Lindelofia
 Lithodora
 Lithospermum
 Lobostemon
 Maharanga
 Mairetis
 Mattiastrum
 Megacaryon
 Melanortocarya
 Memoremea
 Mertensia
 Microcaryum
 Microparacaryum
 Microula
 Mimophytum
 Moltkia
 Moltkiopsis
 Moritzia
 Myosotidium
 Myosotis
 Myriopus
 Nama
 Neatostema
 Nemophila
 Nesocaryum
 Nihon
 Nogalia
 Nonea
 Ogastemma
 Omphalodes
 Omphalolappula
 Omphalotrigonotis
 Oncaglossum
 Onosma
 Oreocarya
 Paracaryum
 Paramoltkia
 Pardoglossum
 Pectocarya
 Pentaglottis
 Phacelia
 Pholisma
 Pholistoma
 Plagiobothrys
 Podonosma
 Pontechium
 Pseudoheterocaryum 
 Pseudolappula
 Pulmonaria
 Rindera
 Rochefortia
 Rochelia
 Romanzoffia
 Rotula
 Sauria
 Selkirkia 
 Simpsonanthus
 Sinojohnstonia
 Solenanthus
 Stenosolenium
 Stephanocaryum
 Suchtelenia
 Symphytum
 Thaumatocaryum
 Thyrocarpus
 Tianschaniella
 Tiquilia
 Tournefortia
 Trachelanthus
 Trachystemon
 Trichodesma
 Trigonocaryum
 Trigonotis
 Turricula
 Varronia
 Valentiniella
 Wellstedia
 Wigandia

References

External links 

 Distribution Map  Genus list  Boraginaceae  Boraginales  Trees  APweb  Missouri Botanical Garden
 Boraginaceae Mabberley's Plant-Book
 Boraginaceae  Plant Names  IPNI
 Home page of James L. Reveal and C. Rose Broome
 Boraginaceae (Search Exact)  Name Search  Tropicos  Missouri Botanical Garden
 Boraginaceae. Topwalks.net: Walking Routes in Spain.
 Boraginaceae. Integrated Taxonomic Information System (ITIS).

Further reading 

 Diane, N., et al. 2002. A systematic analysis of Heliotropium, Tournefortia, and allied taxa of the Heliotropiaceae (Boraginales) based on ITS1 sequences and morphological data. American Journal of Botany 89(2), 287-95.
 Gottschling, M., et al. (2001). Secondary structure of the ITS1 transcript and its application in a reconstruction of the phylogeny of Boraginales. Plant Biology 3, 629-36.

 
Asterid families